Apyu is a former Karok settlement in Humboldt County, California. Its precise location is unknown.

References

Former settlements in Humboldt County, California
Former Native American populated places in California
Karuk villages
Lost Native American populated places in the United States